The Mann Lakes are two close basin lakes in Alberta. Once a single lake named Mann Lake, the construction of Highway 28 in 1961 split the lake in two. Since 1980, their water level has been steadily declining.

See also
List of lakes in Alberta

References

Mann Lakes
County of St. Paul No. 19